WKKX is a News/Talk/Sports formatted broadcast radio station licensed to Wheeling, West Virginia, United States, serving Wheeling in West Virginia and St. Clairsville in Ohio. WKKX is owned and operated by RCK 1 Group, LLC.

Programming
WKKX is a locally-owned station that features local news talk. Notable hosts are Howard Monroe, Steve Novotney, and Bill DiFabio.

In 2009, the long-running Jamboree radio program moved from its longtime home of WWVA, where it had aired from 1933 until its cancellation in the mid-2000s, to WKKX. The Jamboree is the third longest running radio program in the US behind the Grand Ole Opry and Music and the Spoken Word. The Jamboree moved to WWOV no later than 2016.

Daily programming is simulcast on both AM 1600 WKKX and AM 1370 WVLY between 6am-10am and 2pm-6pm.

WKKX is an affiliate of SB Nation, carrying its programming overnight.

Translator

References

External links
FCC History Cards for WKKX
Facebook
AM 1600 WKKX 

KKX